Gail Mabo (born 1965) is an Australian  visual artist who has had her work exhibited across Australia. She is the daughter of land rights campaigner Eddie Mabo and educator and activist Bonita Mabo . She was formerly a dancer and choreographer.

Early life and education

Mabo was born in 1965 and is of the Piadram language group and clan of Mer (Murray Island), an island of the Torres Strait Islands group, which is part of Queensland, Australia. She attended the first school for Aboriginal and Torres Strait Islander children in Townsville, Queensland, which had been opened by her father.

Arts education
Mabo attended Kingscliff TAFE in Sydney from 1998 to 2003, and from 2004 went to the Barrier Reef Institute of TAFE in North Queensland, achieving a Certificate IV in Visual Arts in 2005, followed by a Diploma of Visual Arts in 2007.

She studied dance at the Aboriginal Islander Dance Theatre in Sydney from 1984 to 1987.

Career

Performing arts
Before beginning her studies in art, Mabo had a career in dance, choreography, and acting.

Her performing credits include Tracey Moffat's short films Nice Coloured Girls (actor) and Watch Out (dancer and choreographer), and the 1991 Sydney production of Jimmy Chi's Bran Nue Dae.

In 2005 she directed Koiki, a stage performance based on the life of her father.

Visual art
Her work has since been exhibited in institutions across the country in both solo and group exhibitions. She is a founding member of the Murris in Ink artist collective, a group of Aboriginal and Torres Strait Islander artists in North Queensland.

In 2014, Mabo  was commissioned to create two huge murals at the James Cook University's Singapore campus, using linocut printing. In 2017, she was the featured artist at the Cairns Indigenous Art Fair, and her work honouring her father and her Mer home was bought by the National Gallery of Victoria, and earned an Innovation Award.

During 2017 and 2018, she co-curated Legacy: Reflections on Mabo, an exhibition that was mounted in Townsville in 2019, followed by a four-year tour across the country.

In the 2021–2022 Tarnanthi exhibition at the Art Gallery of South Australia, her sculpture named Tagai, constructed of bamboo sticks and string and a representation of the Southern Cross, was mounted on a wall. it is based on the story of Tagai, which is part of Torres Strait Islanders' tradition al belief system, and passed down through the generations. It is important for navigation, and seen as a man in the constellation of the Southern Cross, with his left hand pointing south.

Her interactive 2021 exhibition, House of Cards, was held at the Umbrella gallery in Townsville, and explored Mabo's home, memories and family relationships.

Mabo has been experimenting with cast bronze, empowered by her 2021 residency at Urban Art Projects.

Other roles
She has also worked with schools in New South Wales as a cultural advisor, and is known as a public speaker, often serving as the family's designated spokesperson.

Personal life
Mabo is the mother of triplets.

Collections
Mabo's work is held by a number of public and private collections, including:

 Artbank - Australia-wide
 Art Gallery of South Australia, Adelaide
 Art Gallery of New South Wales, Sydney
 Australian High Commission, Singapore
 Australian Trade Commission, Singapore
 Australian Maritime Museum, Sydney
 Central Queensland University Collection – Queensland
 James Cook University Collection, Townsville, Singapore and Cairns
 Museum and Art Gallery of the Northern Territory, Darwin
 National Gallery of Victoria
 National Gallery of Australia, Canberra
QAGOMA, Brisbane
State Library of Queensland
Townsville City Council
University of Western Sydney

References

External links 

 Gail Mabo Oral History Interview, State Library of Queensland
 Alf Wilson photographs of Palm Island and area events, State Library of Queensland. Includes various digital photographs of Gail Mabo at events such as Tony Abbott's visit to the Torres Strait Islands in 2015 and the 25th Anniversary Celebrations of the Mabo High Court Victory
 Hi, I'm Eddie: Mabo 30th anniversary podcast, State Library of Queensland. Podcast about the Mabo High Court Case including interviews with Gail Mabo

1965 births
Living people
Artists from Queensland
21st-century Australian women artists
21st-century Australian artists
Indigenous Australian artists